"Nekkoya (Pick Me)" (The word 'Naekkeoya' translates to 'You're mine' in Korean ) is a song performed by the contestants of the competition show Produce 48 and serves as the show's theme song. It was released as a digital single on May 10, 2018 by CJ E&M and Stone Music Entertainment, along with a music video.

Track listing
Digital downloads as shown on iTunes. The Korean version was listed as the lead track. The piano version was listed separately.

Reception
In South Korea, the song did not enter the Gaon Digital Chart, but peaked at number 61 on the Mobile Chart and number 100 on the BGM Chart. In Japan, the song did not enter the Billboard Japan Hot 100, but peaked at number 56 on the Japan Hot 100 Download Chart.

References

External links

Produce 101
2018 singles
2018 songs
Korean-language songs
Electronic dance music songs
K-pop songs
Television game show theme songs